The Reading Blue Mountain and Northern Railroad , sometimes shortened to Reading and Northern Railroad, is a regional railroad in eastern Pennsylvania. Its headquarters is in Port Clinton. Its mainline consists of the Reading Division between Reading and Packerton and the Lehigh Division between Lehighton and Dupont. Its main freight cargo is anthracite coal.

Passenger excursions also run on RBMN tracks. The RBMN itself operates excursion service from Reading and Port Clinton to Jim Thorpe, while the Lehigh Gorge Scenic Railway (LGSR) offers service between Jim Thorpe and Lehigh Gorge State Park.

Main lines
RBMN operates two main lines:
 Reading Division: Reading, Pennsylvania–Packerton, Pennsylvania, along the Lehigh River.
 The line runs from Reading to Packerton along former Reading Company and Central Railroad of New Jersey lines. At its south end, it connects to the Norfolk Southern Railway's Reading Line; its east end is at the Norfolk Southern's Lehigh Line which parallels the RBMN's Lehigh Division.

Lehigh Division: Lehighton, Pennsylvania–Dupont, Pennsylvania (was Mehoopany, Pennsylvania).
 This line forms a fork from Jim Thorpe, Pennsylvania, one branch running westerly through Nesquehoning, Pennsylvania and connecting via a junction to Mahanoy City, Pennsylvania, or Hazleton, Pennsylvania, and the second branch runs northerly via the Lehigh River Gorge, climbs to Mountain Top, Pennsylvania, with a double track running from there most of the way to the Duryea Yard (or Coxton Yard, or Muller Yard) at Duryea, Pennsylvania, and Taylor Yard in Taylor, Pennsylvania, outside Scranton, Pennsylvania.

History
The Blue Mountain and Reading Railroad was founded in 1983 to provide freight service on the former Pennsylvania Railroad Schuylkill Division between Hamburg and Temple. Starting in 1985, the BM&R began operating passenger excursions over the line using two steam locomotives: ex-Gulf, Mobile and Northern Railroad 4-6-2 No. 425 and ex-Reading Company T-1 4-8-4 No. 2102. The BM&R also began operating three more state-owned lines, including the Allentown branch and Colebrookdale branch. The railroad also entered into a partnership with the Reading Company Technical and Historical Society, which leased track space in Leesport and in return leased two diesel locomotives and assorted passenger cars for use on the line.

In 1990, the Blue Mountain and Reading took ownership of 150 miles of track located in the Coal Region north of Reading. Shortly thereafter, the company renamed itself the Reading Blue Mountain and Northern Railroad and moved its headquarters from Hamburg to Port Clinton. Throughout the 1990s and 2000s, the RBMN acquired more lines in northeastern Pennsylvania, primarily of Reading Railroad, Central Railroad of New Jersey, and Lehigh Valley Railroad heritage. 

In the mid-1990s, the RBMN discontinued the regularly scheduled passenger operations between Hamburg and Temple and instead focused on occasional excursions throughout the rest of its system. The partnership between the RBMN and Reading Company Technical and Historical Society had more or less ended by this point, but the group still leased track space in Leesport until 2008 when they moved to the Hamburg yard and opened the Reading Railroad Heritage Museum.

Despite the discontinuation of the Hamburg to Temple excursions, steam operations continued. In 1995, No. 425 was present at the grand opening of Steamtown National Historic Site in Scranton. No. 425 remained at Steamtown until 1997. Between 1998 and late 2008, all steam operations were suspended. 

In 2005, regularly scheduled passenger excursions resumed with the introduction of the Lehigh Gorge Scenic Railway in Jim Thorpe. In December 2016, the RBMN announced that it spent $2 million to build a train station at Pennsylvania Route 61 and Bellevue Avenue in Muhlenberg Township outside Reading, called Reading Outer Station, with plans to operate passenger excursions from there to Jim Thorpe. The first round-trip excursion from Reading Outer Station to Jim Thorpe ran on May 29, 2017. It used refurbished Rail Diesel Cars built by the Budd Company in the 1950s and operated along the Pottsville Line between Pottsville and Philadelphia via Reading until SEPTA discontinued diesel service in 1981. 

Between 2009 and 2010, RBMN expanded operations due to the emergence of Marcellus Shale natural gas drilling in northeastern Pennsylvania. The railroad spent $100,000 to update an outdated and lightly used Pittston Yard between Scranton and Wilkes-Barre.

In 2017, the railroad completed its connections to the Hazleton Shaft and Hazleton Hiller Drying Plant.

In 2019, an audit by the borough of Jim Thorpe revealed the Lehigh Gorge Scenic Railway owed the borough $90,000 in amusement tax. The Railway fought the tax bill in court, where the judge sided with the borough; the railway appealed the decision, arguing that the tourist railroad was "not an amusement". Company officials threatened to leave the borough of Jim Thorpe, and briefly ceased excursion operations in November 2019. RBMN officials shortly thereafter, negotiated a new agreement with the Jim Thorpe Borough government, and excursions resumed in February 2020.

On May 6, 2021, railroad officials announced their purchase of the  Panther Valley line from Carbon County for $4.7 million.

On April 21, 2022, railroad officials announced their purchase of the property of the former KME Fire Apparatus plant in Nesquehoning for $2 million.

Connections
 RBMN operates occasional passenger excursions using restored steam locomotives #425 and #2102. In addition, RBMN operates the Lehigh Gorge Scenic Railway, a heritage railway based in Jim Thorpe. RBMN interchanges with these railroads:
Norfolk Southern Railway – Reading, North Reading, Temple, Lehighton, the historic Mountain Top Yard at Penobscot Knob, and Taylor, where it connects to former Delaware and Hudson Railway trackage in New Jersey, New York, and New England. The northern spur connects the yard in Binghamton, New York, and thence to lower eastern New York State
Delaware-Lackawanna Railroad – Pittston at the Duryea yard, which is operated by the RBMN.
 Connects along the left bank trackage along the main Susquehanna River to New York State railways via the former Lehigh Valley Railroad through the yard at Sayre, Pennsylvania, reaching Rochester, Buffalo, and Erie, Pennsylvania
Lehigh Railway – Mehoopany, Towanda
Luzerne & Susquehanna Railroad – Pittston
Shamokin Valley Railroad – Locust Summit

Equipment

Passenger excursions

The Lehigh Gorge Scenic Railway (LGSR) is a tourist railroad that operates passenger excursions along RBMN trackage from the former Central Railroad of New Jersey station in Jim Thorpe to Old Penn Haven, following the Lehigh River through Lehigh Gorge State Park. Excursions run on weekends, holidays, and some weekdays between May and December. In October, the LGSR operates abbreviated 45-minute trips that offer views of fall foliage in Lehigh Gorge State Park. There are several special excursions that are operated by the LGSR. The Santa Claus Special train operates out of Jim Thorpe between the day after Thanksgiving and the weekend before Christmas, with a visit from Santa Claus aboard the train. LGSR trains are usually diesel-powered and consist of an open-air car, standard coaches, a gondola car that allows passengers to transport the bicycles aboard the train and ride their bicycles back to Jim Thorpe, and a caboose.

The RBMN also operates passenger excursions out of the Reading Outer Station located outside of Reading in Muhlenberg Township, with Rail Diesel Car trains running from Reading Outer Station to Jim Thorpe with an intermediate stop in Port Clinton. The train runs from Reading and Port Clinton to Jim Thorpe in the morning, allowing passengers time to explore Jim Thorpe. The return trip leaves Jim Thorpe in the late afternoon and returns to Port Clinton and Reading in the evening. This excursion operates on select weekends and holidays from May to November.

References

Further reading

External links

Pennsylvania railroads
Spin-offs of Conrail
Tourist attractions in Berks County, Pennsylvania
Tourist attractions in Schuylkill County, Pennsylvania
Transportation in Berks County, Pennsylvania
Heritage railroads in Pennsylvania